Oberappersdorf is a village in the municipality of Zolling, Bavaria, Germany. The St. George Church in Oberappersdorf is affiliated with churches St. Valentine (Gerlhausen) and Obermarchenbach. 
The town is located about 7 km north of Zolling, 15 km north of Freising and about 58 km northeast of Munich.  Nearby towns include Attenkirchen, Moosburg, Nandlstadt and Au in Hallertau. The town's largest business is the Obermeier party house and hotel.

History 
The nearby place "Appersdorf" was first mentioned in 860. The town's name derives from "Village of the abbot" and probably refers to the old possession of the monastery Tegernsee in the area. In 1465 also the village "Nyder Appelstarff" was mentioned, which refers to the present hamlet Unterappersdorf. In the course of administrative reform in Bavaria, the community was created in 1818 as the independent municipality Oberappersdorf. 1972 this community was incorporated into Zolling.

External links 
 Official Website of Zolling - in the German language
 Photo of the Parish church

Freising (district)
Former municipalities in Bavaria